Wolfgang Klotz (born 4 November 1951) is a German former gymnast. He competed at the 1972 and 1976 Summer Olympics in all artistic gymnastics events and won two bronze medals with the East German team. Individually his best achievement was 14th place in the floor exercise in 1972. He won one more bronze team medal at the 1974 World Artistic Gymnastics Championships.

References

1951 births
Sportspeople from Saxony
Living people
German male artistic gymnasts
Olympic gymnasts of East Germany
Gymnasts at the 1972 Summer Olympics
Gymnasts at the 1976 Summer Olympics
Olympic bronze medalists for East Germany
Olympic medalists in gymnastics
Medalists at the 1976 Summer Olympics
Medalists at the 1972 Summer Olympics
Medalists at the World Artistic Gymnastics Championships